Fit To Be You was a short-lived live-action educational series originally produced in the early 1980s by Walt Disney Educational. The series dealt with fitness.

1980
Flexibility and Body Composition (September 1980) 
Heart and Lungs (September 1980)  
Fit to be You: Muscles (September 1980)

Disney educational films
Disney short film series
1980s educational films
1980 films